Rene Corona (born August 17, 1984) is an American soccer player who currently plays for Hollywood United Hitmen in the USL Premier Development League.

Career

College
Corona attended Centennial High School and played college soccer at Santa Ana College, where he was named to the NSCAA Division III Men's Soccer All-Far West Region team as a sophomore in 2005, and helped lead his team to the CCCS Division III national title in 2004, appearing in 23 matches and scoring 7 goals.

Professional
After playing for the amateur Corona Crew in the Coast Soccer League Corona joined the squad of Chivas USA in 2006, and played extensively in the MLS Reserve Division, but featured in just one MLS match before being waived at the end of 2007.

He played in the USL Premier Development League for Bakersfield Brigade in 2008, and moved to the expansion Hollywood United Hitmen in 2009. He scored his first career senior goal for Hollywood on June 19, 2010 in 1 3–0 win over Ventura County Fusion.

References

External links
 Chivas USA bio

American soccer players
Bakersfield Brigade players
Chivas USA players
Hollywood United Hitmen players
Sportspeople from Corona, California
1984 births
Living people
Major League Soccer players
USL League Two players
Junior college men's soccer players in the United States
Association football defenders